Esa Pirnes (born April 1, 1977) is a Finnish former professional ice hockey centre. He began and concluded his 21 year career playing for Oulun Kärpät of the Finnish Liiga. Pirnes was selected by the Los Angeles Kings in the 6th round (174th overall) of the 2003 NHL Entry Draft.

Playing career
Pirnes started his career with Kärpät in the Finnish second league in 1995 and played with them until 1999, when he signed with SM-Liiga club Blues. He stayed with the Blues for two seasons before he moved to rivals Tappara in 2001. In 2003, he was drafted by the Kings after four good seasons in SM-Liiga. Pirnes went over the Atlantic to play in the NHL. But he did not have the same success in NHL as he had in Finland. Despite playing 57 games with LA he only scored 11 points. Before the season was over he also played a few games with the Kings's farm team, Manchester Monarchs of the AHL. He was named to team Finland in the 2004 World Cup of Hockey roster, but did not play a game. But he did not stay in the NHL, instead he went back home to Finland and signed with Lukko for the 2004/05 season.

After one year in Lukko he moved back to his former club, Blues. But after the season he signed with his fifth club in five years, Swedish club Färjestads BK, for the 2006/07 season. In Färjestad he was re-united with his former teammate from Lukko, Janne Niskala. In the Season 2008/2009 Pirnes signed to play for Atlant Moscow Oblast and left the club on May 6, 2009 the club to sign with Jokerit.

In May 2012, Pirnes signed with AIK of the Swedish Elitserien (SEL).

Sometime in 2020, Pirnes became the European Development Coach for the New Jersey Devils of the NHL.

Career statistics

Regular season and playoffs

International

References

External links

1977 births
Living people
AIK IF players
Atlant Moscow Oblast players
Espoo Blues players
Finnish expatriate ice hockey players in Russia
Färjestad BK players
Finnish ice hockey centres
Los Angeles Kings draft picks
Los Angeles Kings players
Lukko players
Manchester Monarchs (AHL) players
Oulun Kärpät players
Sportspeople from Oulu
Tappara players
EV Zug players